The Joab Mershon House is a historic house located at 507 West 5th Street in Vermont, Illinois. Joab Mershon, a local pork packer and banker, had the house built for his family in 1859. The house has an Italianate design with Greek Revival elements; at the time of its construction, the former style was emerging in popularity while the latter was declining, and the house represents a transitional work between the two styles. The Italianate influence is seen most prominently in the hip roof, which features a bracketed cornice and a cupola with matching brackets. Key Greek Revival elements include the dentillation on the entrance and cupola and the ornamental cast iron lintels. The house's interior has a four-over-four plan, which features four rooms on each floor and a central hallway.

The house was added to the National Register of Historic Places on November 7, 1996.

References

Houses on the National Register of Historic Places in Illinois
Greek Revival architecture in Illinois
Italianate architecture in Illinois
Houses completed in 1859
National Register of Historic Places in Fulton County, Illinois
Vermont, Illinois
1859 establishments in Illinois